The Tale of the Wonderful Potato is a 1985 animated film by Anders Sørensen. Sponsored by the Danish Film Institute, it tells the history of the potato through the ages—with a focus on European history and a twinkle in its eye. Potato's humorous and slightly self-deprecating presentation belies the detailed and insightful understanding of human history that carries through from the Incan potato creation myth, to the feisty tuber's heyday in 18th-century haute cuisine.

Educational value

Appropriate audience
A mere 24 minutes long, The Tale of the Wonderful Potato is a schoolroom favorite in Europe, and has won the acclaim of teachers' organizations worldwide. It has been translated (dubbed) into Finnish, English, German and Dutch, and it is recommended for grades 5 through 8 due to the versatile nature of its presentation, coupled with a detailed narrative voice.

Topics
Topics covered include:
 History of the potato (South America and Europe)
 World leaders involved in the history of the potato
 Social climate during the 16th to 18th centuries
 Major world events in the 16th to 18th centuries
 Nutrition, storage and preparation of potatoes

References

External links 
 

1985 films
Animated documentary films
Danish animated short films
Danish short documentary films
Documentary films about agriculture
Potatoes
1980s short documentary films
1985 documentary films
1985 animated films
1985 short films
1980s Danish-language films